The Kansas City, Kaw Valley and Western Railway  was an interurban electric railway that ran between the American cities of Lawrence, Kansas, and Kansas City, Missouri, between 1914 and 1963. Passenger service was eliminated on the Lawrence segment prior to its demise in 1949.  The line between Kansas City, Kansas and Bonner Springs, Kansas remained an electric freight operation until 1963. Major portions of Kansas Highway 32 are built on the original roadbed.

The line was opened in 1914 between Kansas City and Bonner Springs, Kansas. In 1916 the line extended to Lawrence. The line had 75 passenger station stops, and trains left Kansas City hourly between 5:30 a.m. and 12:30 p.m.

See also
List of interurbans

References

External links
University of Kansas history

Kansas City interurban railways
Douglas County, Kansas
Transportation in Wyandotte County, Kansas
Leavenworth County, Kansas
Railway companies established in 1914
1935 disestablishments in the United States
Defunct Kansas railroads
Defunct Missouri railroads
American companies established in 1914
Railway lines opened in 1914
Railway lines closed in 1963